Harm Geert Buiter (8 January 1922 – 22 February 2011) was a Dutch trade unionist and politician.

Born in Tubbergen in the Netherlands, Buiter studied economics in Amsterdam, but was expelled for anti-Nazi activity during World War II.  After the war, he completed his studies in England, then in 1947 returned to the Netherlands to work for the General Dutch Metalworkers' Union.  In 1956, he was appointed as secretary of the European Coal and Steel Community's trade union committee, then in 1958 became secretary of its successor, the European Trades Union Secretariat.

In 1967, Buiter was elected as general secretary of the International Confederation of Free Trade Unions, but he retired five years later due to poor health.  He was elected as the Mayor of Groningen, serving until 1985.

Buiter's son, Willem, became a notable economist.

References

1922 births
2011 deaths
Dutch resistance members
Dutch trade unionists
General Secretaries of the International Confederation of Free Trade Unions
Labour Party (Netherlands) politicians
Mayors of Groningen
People from Tubbergen